Nototropis is a genus of amphipod crustaceans, in the family, Atylidae, and was first described by Achille Costa in 1853.

Species
The genus contains the following species:

 Nototropis brevitarsus Ledoyer, 1979
 Nototropis comes Giles, 1888
 Nototropis dentatus Schellenberg, 1931
 Nototropis falcatus (Metzer, 1871)
 Nototropis granulosus Walker, 1904
 Nototropis guttatus Costa, 1853
 Nototropis homochir (Haswell, 1885)
 Nototropis massiliensis Bellan-Santini, 1975
 Nototropis megalops Moore, 1984
 Nototropis melanops Oldevig, 1959
 Nototropis minikoi (A. O. Walker, 1905)
 Nototropis nordlandicus Boeck, 1871
 Nototropis reductus K. H. Barnard, 1930
 Nototropis serratus Schellenberg, 1925
 Nototropis smitti Goës, 1866
 Nototropis swammerdamei (Milne-Edwards, 1830)
 Nototropis taupo J. L. Barnard, 1972
 Nototropis tulearensis (Ledoyer, 1982)
 Nototropis urocarinatus McKinney, 1980
 Nototropis vedlomensis Bate & Westwood, 1863

References

External links

Gammaridea
Crustaceans described in 1853
Taxa named by Achille Costa